= Stephen Durden =

American electrical engineer

Stephen Durden is an American electrical engineer at the Jet Propulsion Laboratory in Pasadena, California. He was named a Fellow of the Institute of Electrical and Electronics Engineers (IEEE) in 2012 for his contributions to microwave remote sensing and radar systems, including spaceborne cloud radar.
